New Maps of Hell is the third album by composer Paul Schütze, released in 1992 through Extreme Records.

Track listing

Personnel 
Musicians
Simone De Haan – trombone
Peter Jones – drums
Frank Lipson – digital media
Bill McDonald – bass guitar
Peter Neville – percussion
Paul Schütze – keyboards, percussion, engineering, production
Mark Stafford – guitar
François Tétaz – percussion
Gareth Vanderhope – effects
Production and additional personnel
Craig Carter – recording
Richard Grant – illustrations, design
Garry Havrillay – engineering, mastering

References

External links 
 

1992 albums
Big Cat Records albums
Extreme Records albums
Paul Schütze albums
Albums produced by Paul Schütze